Action League Now! (advertised as Action League Now!: The Series when packaged into a half-hour block) is a series of stop motion shorts that aired as part of both All That and KaBlam! on Nickelodeon. It was made using "chuckimation", a combination of stop-frame animation and live-action shots where things are simply thrown ("chucked") or dropped into frame to simulate movement, and wiggled around to simulate talking. The series follows the adventures of a superhero league, composed of various action figures, toys, and dolls. The show was created by Robert Mittenthal, Will McRobb, and Albie Hecht.

Most episodes took place in a house of an unseen resident. Many of the characters were voiced by radio personalities from Pittsburgh.

From 1998 to February 10, 2002, Nickelodeon briefly ran Action League Now! shorts on their own, combined to fill a half-hour timeslot. These standalone edits are available on Paramount+.

Characters
 The Flesh (Jim Krenn) "He's super strong and super naked!" A blonde, muscular, dimwitted bodybuilder who never wears clothes. His catchphrases include simple, immature terms such as "Ouchies!", "Oopsies!", and "Yummies!". The Flesh is rather clumsy and usually gets in the way of the other Action Leaguers when they're trying to save the day (by injuring them), but means no harm. His super power is super strength and he has been shown capable of lifting things many times his sizes such as buses and bricks. The figure used for Flesh was a modified Conan the Adventurer action figure.

 Thundergirl (Cris Winter) "She flies ... like thunder!" The only female member of the team, as well as the only one with the ability to fly. She usually accompanies her flight with a song similar to the tune of John Williams' Star Wars theme with the lyrics, "Thundergirl flying like thunder," (This was dropped later on in the series). Thundergirl does not appreciate Meltman's crush on her, and usually ignores his professions of love (and sometimes slaps him). She does not seem to think of herself as an equal to the rest of the League, thinking of herself as superior instead. A recurring gag is her statement that she will use her super strength only to realize too late that she doesn't have super strength. The figure used for Thundergirl was a Sindy doll's head on an unknown superhero figure body. Her image is a combination of Barbie and She-Ra.

 Stinky Diver (Jim Krenn) "A former navy commando with an attitude as bad as his odor!" A mustachioed diver who is often seen in or around toilets. He speaks with an Australian-type accent, even though an episode title ("Mad Dogs and Englishmen") suggested him being English. In the same episode as mentioned above, it is revealed that he became cold after his mom ratted him out to the enemy during the Gulf War for money. As his name makes obvious, Stinky has a foul odor, but the Action League seems to have gotten used to it and don't mind it most of the time. Owns a beach house (in reality, a life-size portable toilet) and a vast collection of toilet paper, which come in many different colors. He is the most frequent driver of the Action Mobile, the League's official transportation device (a big, red remote-control car). Although he lacks any superpowers he has the ability to pull a spear gun out of thin air and can fire a seemingly endless amount of plastic missiles. Stinky is an altered 1994 G.I. Joe Shipwreck action figure.

 Meltman (Scott Paulsen) "With the power to... melt!" Meltman has the "power" to melt and is the smallest and weakest member of the Action League. He has a long-running crush on Thundergirl, who does not reciprocate his feelings for her. As melting is his only ability, Meltman is quite unhelpful and a borderline burden and is considered by the rest of the League to be their personal servant, often fulfilling such chores as getting them sodas, donuts, and other things. For this reason, Meltman is always looking for ways to get the League to appreciate him. In two different episodes, it is revealed that his full name is Barry Meltfarb, although he claims to have changed the surname to his superhero name. As he once stated to a viewer he has never used his power since there is no need for it. The Chief considers him to be "as yellow as a jar of mustard at a jaundice convention." Meltman is a Robin Hood figure that was melted with a blow torch.

 The Chief (Collin M. McGee, majority; Victor Hart, first few episodes) The head of the Action League, the Chief is an angry, frustrated man who frequently yells at the Action League for their mistakes and unintended backtalk. His catchphrase is "Blast it!" and "You morons!" He once got a heart transplant from Bill the Lab Guy. He also once successfully awoke from a coma, induced by the Flesh's carelessness, after having had to listen to all of the incidents in which the League had injured him during his extended sleep. The Chief was made by putting together and modifying parts from Playskool "Play People" dollhouse figures.

 Justice (Alyssa Grahm) The Chief's beloved Golden Retriever and best friend. Technically a member of the Action League, Justice serves as the Lassie of the show, warning fellow members of the League of dangers that they were otherwise unaware of. Featured in almost every episode as a background character, with its only starring role being in "Dog Day Afterschool".

 The Mayor (Jim Krenn) "His dishonor" The Action League's archenemy. The reasons for his dislike of the Action League are unknown, but his hatred is obvious. His catchphrase is "Uh oh, here's trouble" or "I hate Mondays" whenever he's about to be defeated. Instances in which the Mayor attempts to destroy the League include sucking them up with a massive vacuum cleaner, and blowing them away with a giant fan. Many of his schemes revolve around making money. In one episode, his pseudonym was revealed to be "Louis D. Mayor" (a reference to Louis B. Mayer). He also appears to have a fixation with becoming a celebrity, a successful musician, or a National Football League player. In the episode, "Sinkhole of Doom" it was revealed that the Mayor has a son. The Mayor was pieced together from various Playskool dollhouse figures. The voice that Jim Krenn used for the character was initially used by Krenn as a parody of then-Pittsburgh mayor Tom Murphy.

Bill the Lab Guy (Jim Krenn) A scientist who often messes up his experiments and predicaments. During every appearance, he is guaranteed to be heard saying, "There's nothing I can do," or, "I was afraid of this!" and "I don't see any connection." Bill has a monotone voice and takes himself very seriously as a scientist, even though his experiments almost always go awry. He has a teenage daughter named Quarky who helps him around the lab. He appears to have a love for oldies music and is a personal friend of late musician Lou Rawls. Bill, along with the Mayor and the Chief, was pieced together in part from various Playskool dollhouse figures. His name is a reference to Bill Nye the Science Guy.

Hodge Podge (Jim Krenn) The Action League's former accountant, Hodge Podge was accidentally thrown into and chopped up in a blender, then horribly rebuilt by Bill the Lab Guy against his will, making him a freak with parts of random toys and household objects (such as a claw for a hand, taken from a crab toy and the top portion of a fork attached to his chest). Hodge Podge appears to be more hands-on and successful than the Mayor with his initial tactics, even though neither of them ever get their way. He specifically works with mechanics to get his way (brainwashing radio station, custom-built remote control, modified voicebox, etc.).

Quarky (Cris Winter) Bill the Lab Guy's teenage daughter who helps him around the lab. Occasionally, she gets into situations that the Action League has to rescue her from. She is the focus in one episode, "The Quarky Syndrome," where she was involved in a nuclear waste accident and goes by the alias Superteen.

The Announcer (Scott Paulsen) The narrator of the program, using various alliterations and overreactions often before and after the short's commercial bridge. He sometimes breaks the fourth wall during an episode. He has a deep, monotone voice, not unlike Bill the Lab Guy's and is never seen, only heard.

The Action League have had various other villains throughout the show's run, including (but not limited to) a gigantic baby simply named "Big Baby", a Mesozoic monster (in reality, a dog Jack Russell Terrier) called Spotzilla, a rival superhero league known as the Danger Society, a bald genius known as Smarty Pants, an enemy of Stinky's past called Red Ninja, a group of evil aliens, a gypsy who cursed The Chief, a married couple who pretended to be Flesh’s parents and a mummy brought to life by The Mayor. Sometimes, due to their own collective stupidity, even the League themselves can be the main cause of a problem.

Episodes

Guest appearances
 There have been numerous guest appearances, including National Football League players Brett Favre, John Elway, Kordell Stewart, Troy Aikman, and Bill Cowher, the rock band Kiss, musician-actor Harry Connick, Jr., pop singer Robyn, and musician Lou Rawls. All voiced themselves on the program (with the exception of Robyn and Connick, who voiced Blandi and Big Baby, respectively, in the episode "Rock-a-big Baby" which was paired theatrically with Good Burger).

Banned episodes
Some episodes of Action League Now are banned in the United States. One specific episode to be put under this ban was the season 2 episode "Caged Thunder" due to its themes of terrorism. Due to this, the KaBlam episode it was aired with titled "I Just Don't Get It" was put under a ban after the 9/11 attacks. The "Action League Now: The Series" episode "Thunder Girl: Tracking the Storm" which also contained the short was put on a ban after its initial broadcast in 2002, only being re-shown in 2016 on the late night TV block "The Splat" on Teen Nick. The episode can still be watched on Paramount+.

Reception
In a Chicago Tribune article, Jennifer Mangan complimented the series' originality, calling it "the most innovative entrant in KaBlam!s cartoon catalog." Jane Hall of the Los Angeles Times wrote that Action League Now! "has the weird, aggressive humor of the old 'Mr. Bill' pieces on Saturday Night Live." Naming the show among other KaBlam! segments, Deadline Hollywoods Mike Fleming wrote positively of its "absurdly unforgettable characters."

References

External links
 

2001 American television series debuts
2002 American television series endings
2000s American animated television series
2000s American superhero comedy television series
2000s Nickelodeon original programming
All That
KaBlam!
Action figures
Television series created by Robert Mittenthal
American stop-motion animated television series
American children's animated action television series
American children's animated adventure television series
American children's animated comedy television series
American children's animated superhero television series
American animated television spin-offs
American television series with live action and animation
Nicktoons
English-language television shows